The Landmark Trust is a British building conservation charity, founded in 1965 by Sir John and Lady Smith, that rescues buildings of historic interest or architectural merit and then makes them available for holiday rental. The Trust's headquarters is at Shottesbrooke in Berkshire.

Most Trust properties are in England, Scotland and Wales. Several are on Lundy Island off the coast of north Devon, operated under lease from the National Trust. In continental Europe there are Landmark sites in Belgium, France and Italy. Five properties are in the United States — all in Vermont — one of which, Naulakha, was the home of Rudyard Kipling in the 1890s.

The Trust is a charity registered in England & Wales and in Scotland. The American sites are owned by an independent sister charity, Landmark Trust USA. There is also an Irish Landmark Trust.

Those who rent Landmarks provide a source of funds to support restoration costs and building maintenance. The first rentals were in 1967 when six properties were available. The Trust's 200th property, Llwyn Celyn, opened for rental in October 2018. Landmark sites include forts, farmhouses, manor houses, mills, cottages, castles, gatehouses, follies and towers and represent historic periods from medieval to the 20th century.

Governance and administration 
The Trust employs a 400-strong workforce headed by a Director. Anna Keay was appointed Director in 2012, succeeding Peter Pearce (1995–2012) and Robin Evans FRICS (1986–1995).

The work of the Trust is overseen by a Board of Trustees chaired by Neil Mendoza.

Prince Charles became Patron of the Landmark Trust in 1995.

A group of high-profile supporters act as Ambassadors for the Trust, helping to raise awareness of the Trust's role in rescuing and preserving remarkable buildings.  As at March 2017 these were: David Armstrong-Jones; George Clarke; Nicholas Coleridge; Simon Jenkins; Griff Rhys Jones; and Natascha McElhone.

In media
The Gothic Temple at Stowe was filmed in March 1999 as the Scottish Chapel in the Bond movie The World is Not Enough.

In May 2015 five life-sized sculptures by Antony Gormley, titled Land, were placed near the centre of the UK and at four compass points, in a commission by the Landmark Trust to celebrate its 50th anniversary. They were at Lowsonford (Warwickshire), Lundy (Bristol Channel), Clavell Tower (Dorset), Saddell Bay (Mull of Kintyre), and the Martello Tower (Aldeburgh, Suffolk). The sculpture at Saddell Bay is to remain in place permanently following an anonymous donation and the granting of planning permission. The sculpture on Lundy was relocated to Cambridge.

The work of the Trust was the subject of a six-part Channel 4 television documentary, Restoring Britain's Landmarks, first broadcast in October 2015.

Four Channel 4 programmes, Great British Buildings: Restoration of the Year, transmitted from 23 March 2017, were co-hosted by Landmark Trust Director Anna Keay and Kevin McCloud. Buildings featured included Belmont.

Properties available for holiday lets
The following lists aim to be complete and illustrate both the variety of structures and geographical spread of the trust.  In the Trust's early years, prior to the incorporation of the charity, properties were often bought with the support of the Manifold Trust.  The Trust's current portfolio also includes properties bequeathed to the Trust, leased, or operated through a management agreement on behalf of other owners.  Dates of acquisition and first lettings are shown where available from Landmark Trust or other published sources; time differences between dates often reflect previous/current ownership and the extent of restoration required.

Detailed histories of each building are prepared by the Trust's Historian during its renovation.  These include summaries plus before and after photographs of restoration works as carried out.  Each building history is then left as an album in the property for visitors to peruse.  All Trust property history albums were made available online for the first time in October 2018.

Channel Islands

Fort Clonque, Alderney
Nicolle Tower, St Clement, Jersey

England

Lundy

The Landmark Trust manages the Island of Lundy in the Bristol Channel on behalf of the National Trust, and operates a number of holiday cottages there. The properties managed by the Trust include:
 The Barn
 Bramble Villa East
 Bramble Villa West
 Castle and Keep Cottages
 Government House
 Hanmers
 Millcombe House
 The Old House
 The Old Light
 The Old School
 The Quarters
 Radio Room
 St John's
 Square Cottage
 Stoneycroft
 Tibbets

London and South East England

East of England

North of England

Midlands

Southwest

Scotland

Wales

Belgium
Hougoumont, close to the site of the Battle of Waterloo. The Trust contributed to the Chateau Hougoumont farm's £3M restoration, from 2013.  An apartment in the former gardener's cottage over the south gates has been let since 2015.

France
 La Célibataire, Le Maison des Amis and Le Moulin de la Tuilerie, Gif-sur-Yvette, Essonne.  Let since 2010.

Italy

 Casa de Mar, San Fruttuoso – from summer 2016
 Casa Guidi, Florence – from 1995
 Piazza di Spagna, Rome – from 1982
 Sant'Antonio, Tivoli – from 1995
 Villa Saraceno, Agugliaro – restored 1984–1995
 Villa dei Vescovi, Padua (two apartments) – from 2006

United States
 Amos Brown House
 The Dutton Farmhouse
 Naulakha (Rudyard Kipling House)
 Kipling's Carriage House, Naulakha
 The Sugarhouse

Properties under restoration 
As at March 2020, the following properties were being restored by the Trust for future lettings:

Semaphore Tower, Chatley Heath, Cobham, Surrey.  Only remaining semaphore tower from the Napoleonic era, listed Grade II*.  An appeal for £160,000 representing the remaining 25% of its restoration cost was launched on 19 March 2019.  The appeal has reached its target, and restoration work is now underway.

Projects in development 
As at March 2019, plans for restoring and renovating the following properties were under active development:
 Calverley Old Hall, Main Wing – adjacent to existing property let.  The pre-qualification stage of an architectural competition for the Hall's restoration closed on 1 August 2017, when likely construction costs were estimated at £2.3m.  On 13 February 2018 the Trust announced that the competition had been won by Cowper Griffith.  Consultation with local residents on the proposed designs took place in March 2018.  Awaiting appeal launch, previously planned for 2019.
 Fairburn Tower, Inverness.  Category A listed Tower House, built in 1545 for Murdo Mackenzie, Gentleman of the Bedchamber for King James V.  Restoration proposals developed by Simpson and Brown as Project Architects.  £500,000 grant pledged by Historic Environment Scotland.  Appeal for £800,000 launched May 2018.  By autumn/winter 2019 all but £89,000 had been raised.  Restoration work was expected to start soon thereafter for a planned completion in late summer 2021.

New potential projects announced by February 2020 for development were:

Ibsley Watch Tower, Ibsley, Hampshire - Derelict watch tower at one of the twelve RAF airfields in the New Forest.  Held on a 99-year lease by RAF Ibsley Heritage Trust.
Mayor's Parlour Block, Maison Dieu, Dover, Kent - Part of 1835 transformation of Grade I complex of civic buildings dating back to 1204.
Mavisbank, nr Edinburgh, Midlothian - Joint project with Historic Environment Scotland for Scotland's first Palladian villa.

Other projects previously considered for restoration 
Other properties previously considered by the Trust, but not progressed to completion, include:

 Almshouses, Denton, Lincolnshire – demolished by then owner Sir Bruno Welby, subsequently convicted in 1980 of unauthorised demolition of historic buildings and fined £1,000 plus costs
Falsgrave Signal Box, Scarborough, North Yorkshire - under consideration from 2016 to March 2019
The Master's House, Maidstone, Kent – rejected 2002 on grounds of size
 Mausoleum, Seaton Delavel – rejected for risk of repayment of Department of the Environment grant
 Warder's Tower, Biddulph, Staffordshire – leased from Staffordshire County Council 2008–2010, returned when no acceptable solution could be found for dealing with four colonies of bats

Former properties 
Properties formerly run as holiday lets and owned, leased or run by the Landmark Trust on a management arrangement basis include:
 All Saint's Vicarage, Maidenhead – First floor flat in Vicarage complex designed by G.E. Street.  Advertised as being prepared for opening for lets in 1990 and in 1991 but not listed in 1992.
 Edale Mill, Edale, Derbyshire – The Trust bought the mill in 1969 and converted it into seven flats.  Six were sold after conversion with one being retained for holiday lets until c2012.
 Fish Court, Hampton Court Palace – owned by Historic Royal Palaces.  Withdrawn from property portfolio in 2014.
 The Harp Inn, Old Radnor, Powys 
 Higher Lettaford, North Bovey, Devon – sold in 2013 as no longer appropriate to the Trust's property portfolio
 Hill House, Helensburgh – top floor flat returned to National Trust for Scotland in 2011.
 The Master's House, Gladstone Pottery – The Gladstone Pottery Museum was transferred to Stoke-on-Trent Museums in 1994.
 Meikle Ascog, Ascog, Argyll & Bute – sold in 2013 as no longer appropriate to the Trust's property portfolio
 Sandford House, 7 Lower High St, Stourbridge, West Midlands
 30, St Mary's Lane, Tewkesbury – bought in 1969 and let to local tenants from 2006.
 Wellbrook Beetling Mill, Cookstown, Co Tyrone – returned to National Trust

Legacy Estate – other properties owned by the Trust 
In addition to properties let for holiday rentals, the Trust has been bequeathed other properties which it has refurbished and managed in other ways, through its Legacy Estate.  These include:

 Fountain Hotel, 92 High Street, Cowes, Isle of Wight – acquired 2010
 The Tower, Netherne Hospital, Netherne-on-the-Hill, Coulsdon, Surrey – bequeathed 2015

Handbooks 
Details of each property available to rent are available online, on the Trust's website, and in a Handbook.  Twenty-five editions of the Handbook have been published to December 2016:

Archives
The Landmark Trust Lundy Island Philatelic Archive was donated to the British Library Philatelic Collections in 1991 and is located at the British Library.

Further reading 
 Landmark, A History of Britain in 50 Buildings. 2015. Keay, Anna and Stanford, Caroline.  Francis Lincoln Ltd.

References

External links

 – official site
Landmark Trust properties' photos on Flickr

 
Architecture in the United Kingdom
Historic preservation organizations
Environmental charities based in the United Kingdom
Lundy
Organisations based in Berkshire
Royal Borough of Windsor and Maidenhead
Organizations established in 1965